The Who Tour 2006–2007 was The Who's first worldwide concert tour since 1997, supporting their Endless Wire album.

History
In December 2005, Rolling Stone magazine announced that The Who would be touring in the summer of 2006, visiting Australia, Canada, Japan, Spain, the United Kingdom, and the United States. In advance of their new Endless Wire album release, the band embarked on a 24-date European tour followed by their first world tour, their first shows since their short 2004 tours and brief performance at Live 8 in 2005. Members of the group's 2002 and 2004 line-up remained, namely Roger Daltrey and Pete Townshend but also including keyboardist John "Rabbit" Bundrick (due to the illness of his wife, replaced on 25 shows over two legs of the tour by his keyboard tech, Brian Kehew), bassist Pino Palladino, drummer Zak Starkey and guitarist/backup vocalist Simon Townshend. Opening acts featured on the worldwide tour included The Casbah Club, Peeping Tom, moe., Inward Eye, Rose Hill Drive, The Pretenders, and The Tragically Hip.

It was announced at short notice that the opening gig of the tour would be at the University of Leeds Refectory on 17 June, the same venue at which the band recorded the Live at Leeds album in 1970. Tickets to this particular show were sold in person only from the Leeds University Union, with sales limited to two tickets per person. Before the concert Daltrey and Townshend unveiled a blue plaque to commemorate the recording of Live at Leeds at the same venue 36 years before. The show was so greatly anticipated that the BBC covered the story, both on the day of the concert and the day after, including interviews with audience members as they were leaving the performance.

In July, the group played a number of music festivals around the UK, including the second day of Hyde Park Calling, a concert to celebrate the twenty year anniversary of the Hard Rock Cafe, on 2 July, Oxegen in Ireland on 8 July, and T in the Park in Scotland on 9 July. When The Who performed at Hyde Park Calling, they were joined by Top Gear presenters Jeremy Clarkson, James May and Richard Hammond to test vans. The episode was broadcast on 30 July 2006.

Shows from the entire European tour were broadcast online at the band's website. Video streaming company Streaming Tank were in charge of broadcasting the concerts, headed up by the technical team for The Lord of the Rings film trilogy. This was the first attempt by any band to broadcast entire shows via the Internet since the Pixelon-sponsored "Vegas Job" (later released on DVD as The Vegas Job) in October 1999, which had been the band's first attempt at live broadcasting over the internet. Most of the European shows were preceded in the broadcast by an episode of the web TV program, In The Attic, presented by Rachel Fuller and Mikey Cuthbert. At festivals such as the O2 Festival in Leeds, the opening artists for The Who appeared as guests on the show once they came off stage.

On 12 September, The band opened the first leg of the North American tour in Philadelphia at the Wachovia Center, then later appeared at the BBC's Electric Proms and on the Parkinson before returning to the United States. The second North American leg concluded in Columbus, Ohio on 11 December.

The group spent most of the first half of 2007 touring again, starting with a return trip to North America that began on 23 February in Reno, Nevada and ended on 26 March in Hollywood, Florida, followed by the band's Teenage Cancer Trust benefit concert at the Royal Albert Hall in London on 31 March. An extensive trip through various parts of the United Kingdom and Europe began in Lisbon, Portugal on 16 May and concluded in Helsinki, Finland on 9 July. The band also did a one-off show on 6 October at Messegelände in Hanover, Germany to celebrate the International Volkswagen Minibus Meeting. The band also flew to South Africa to do another 46664 concert to celebrate World AIDS Day.

The 2006–2007 tours were financially successful and well received by fans and critics alike, with only a couple of minor setbacks. One incident occurred on 8 December 2006 in Saint Paul, Minnesota, when Daltrey's voice gave out near the end of a performance. Daltrey had apologised to the audience earlier in the concert, saying that he was suffering from bronchitis. On 13 March 2007 the band came on stage as usual in Tampa, Florida but abruptly ended the show moments into the opening number when it became painfully clear that Daltrey was unable to sing at all. Townshend stopped the band and apologised, saying they wanted to at least "give it a go" despite Daltrey being seriously ill with an upper respiratory infection. The band's manager Bill Curbishley quickly rescheduled the show, which was successfully performed on 25 March. Dates in Mexico City and San Antonio, Texas were also postponed, but the band ultimately chose to cancel them instead.
Another incident occurred in Verona, Italy, on 11 June 2007 when a massive rainstorm forced the band to stop the concert after only five songs, and when they came back on stage over an hour later, Daltrey found himself unable to sing. Townshend announced the show was cancelled, but ferocious booing from the rain-soaked crowd persuaded the band to return to the stage 40 minutes later to play the rest of the set, this time with Pete doing most of the vocals and a raucous and visibly frustrated Daltrey singing just a verse here and there when his voice permitted, giving all he could in the final "Won't Get Fooled Again".

Live releases
Live material from 2006–2007 has appeared on the following releases:

Every performance from 2006–2007 was recorded on both CD and DVD, and (except for the Leeds concert) is available as part of the Encore Series 2006 and 2007 scheme of releases.
Parts of the band's show of 17 July 2006 at Théâtre Antique in Vienne, Isère, France (near Lyon) were included on CD and DVD in the expanded edition of the Endless Wire album:
CD includes: "The Seeker", "Who Are You", "Mike Post Theme", "The Relay", "Greyhound Girl", "Naked Eye", "Won't Get Fooled Again"/"Old Red Wine".
DVD includes: "I Can't Explain", "Behind Blue Eyes", "Mike Post Theme", "Baba O'Riley", "Won't Get Fooled Again"/"Old Red Wine".

Tour band
Roger Daltrey – lead vocals, harmonica, acoustic guitar, rhythm guitar, tambourine
Pete Townshend – lead guitar, acoustic guitar, vocals, banjo
Additional Members
Pino Palladino – bass guitar
Zak Starkey – drums
John "Rabbit" Bundrick – keyboards, piano, backing vocals
Simon Townshend – rhythm guitar, acoustic guitar, vocals, mandolin
Brian Kehew – keyboards, piano (substituted for Bundrick over a period in late 2006)

Typical set lists

2006 UK/Europe Leg
This particular leg of the tour lasted from 7 June 2006 in Hertfordshire until 29 July 2006 in Zaragoza, Spain. This leg featured the first live performances of certain songs from Endless Wire, such as the mini-opera "Wire & Glass" and "Mike Post Theme". The typical setlist consisted of ( All songs written by Pete Townshend except where noted)

"I Can't Explain"
"The Seeker"
"Anyway, Anyhow, Anywhere" (Roger Daltrey and Townshend)
"Who Are You"
"Behind Blue Eyes"
"Sound Round" (Dropped after 25 June)
"Pick Up The Peace" (Dropped after 25 June)
"Endless Wire" (Dropped after 25 June)
"We Got A Hit" (Dropped after 25 June)
"They Made My Dream Come True" (Dropped after 25 June)
"Mirror Door" (Dropped after 25 June)
"Real Good Looking Boy" (Townshend, Luigi Creatore, Hugo Peretti and George David Weiss)
"Mike Post Theme" (not on 7 June; and 8 July.)
"Baba O'Riley"
"The Kids Are Alright"
"Naked Eye" (Added on 14 July)
"The Relay" (Added on 11 July)
"You Better You Bet" (Added on 5 July)
"My Generation" (Added on 28 June)
"Won't Get Fooled Again"
"Substitute"
"Pinball Wizard"
"Amazing Journey"
"Sparks"
"See Me, Feel Me"
There were some set list substitutions, variations, and order switches during the tour. "Old Red Wine" was not performed at all the shows, and was sometimes attached to the end of "Won't Get Fooled Again" or "See Me, Feel Me". Three of the first four shows had the Tommy medley played as the regular set ender with "Won't Get Fooled Again" moving to the encore. Other songs occasionally played were:
 "Let's See Action" (Performed on 17 and 28 June and 5, 11, 12, 15, and 23 July).
 "Old Red Wine" (Performed on 25 and 30 June and 15, 17, 18, 22, and 27 July)
"Eminence Front" (Performed on 17 June)
 "Magic Bus" (Performed on 15 July)
"Cry If You Want" (Performed on 17, 25, and 28 June and 27 and 29 July)
"Bargain" (Performed on 28 and 30 June and 2 and 3 July)
"Love, Reign o'er Me" (Performed on 28 and 30 June and 2, 3, 5, 6, 9, 20, 22, 27, and 29 July.)
"I'm One" (Performed on 30 June)
"Greyhound Girl" (Pete Townshend solo song) (Performed on 14 and 17 July)
"Drowned" (acoustic) (Performed on 18 and 25 June and 2, 6, 18, 27, and 29 July)

2006 US/Canada leg
This particular leg of the tour lasted from 12 September 2006 in Philadelphia until 11 December 2006 in Columbus, Ohio. Here is the typical setlist of the first leg, all songs written by Pete Townshend except where noted.

"I Can't Explain"
"The Seeker"
"Anyway, Anyhow, Anywhere" (Roger Daltrey and Townshend)
"Baba O'Riley"
"Behind Blue Eyes"
"Real Good Looking Boy" (Townshend, Luigi Creatore, Hugo Peretti and George David Weiss)
"Sound Round"
"Pick Up the Peace"
"Endless Wire"
"We Got a Hit"
"They Made My Dream Come True"
"Mirror Door"
"The Relay"
"You Better You Bet"
"Who Are You"
"A Man in a Purple Dress"
"Black Widow's Eyes"
"Fragments" (Lawrence Ball and Townshend)
"My Generation"
"Cry If You Want"
"Won't Get Fooled Again"
"Substitute"
"Pinball Wizard"
"Amazing Journey"
"Sparks"
"See Me, Feel Me"
"Tea & Theatre"
By the time the band reached the second leg of this tour, on November, they switched the order of a few songs, added some and dropped some as well. Here is the typical setlist for the second US leg, All songs written by Pete Townshend except where noted.

"I Can't Explain"
"The Seeker"
"Substitute" (Replaced with "Anyway, Anyhow, Anywhere" (Roger Daltrey and Townshend) after 18 November)
"Fragments" (Lawrence Ball and Townshend)
"Who Are You"
"Behind Blue Eyes"
"Sound Round"
"Pick Up the Peace"
"Endless Wire"
"We Got a Hit"
"They Made My Dream Come True"
"Mirror Door"
"Baba O'Riley"
"Eminence Front"
"A Man in a Purple Dress"
"Mike Post Theme"
"You Better You Bet"
"My Generation"
"Cry If You Want"
"Won't Get Fooled Again"
"Pinball Wizard"
"Amazing Journey"
"Sparks"
"See Me, Feel Me"
"Tea & Theatre"
There were some set list substitutions, variations, and order switches during the tour. "Black Widow's Eyes" was sometimes inserted between "A Man in a Purple Dress" and "Mike Post Theme". Also, at a concert in Saint Paul, Minnesota, the traditional encore was skipped and a medley of "My Generation", "Cry If You Want" and "Naked Eye" was played because singer Roger Daltrey left the stage due to voice problems. Here is a list of the rest of the songs performed on the tour but not on the above lists:
"Naked Eye" (Performed on 25 September and 8 and 11 December)
 "Unholy Trinity" (Performed on 12 and 13 September and 5 October)
"Bargain" (Performed on 25 September)
"My Generation Blues" (Performed on 25 September)
"Old Red Wine" (Performed on 10 October and 11 December)
"Overture" (Performed on 5 November)

2007 US Leg
This particular leg of the tour lasted from 23 February 2007 in Reno, Nevada until 26 March 2007 in Hollywood, Florida. Here is a typical setlist for the leg of the tour, All songs written by Pete Townshend except where noted.

"I Can't Explain"
"The Seeker"
"Anyway, Anyhow, Anywhere" (Roger Daltrey and Townshend)
"Fragments" (Lawrence Ball and Townshend)
"Who Are You"
"Behind Blue Eyes"
"Real Good Looking Boy" (Townshend, Luigi Creatore, Hugo Peretti and George David Weiss)
"Sound Round"
"Pick Up the Peace"
"Endless Wire"
"We Got a Hit"
"They Made My Dream Come True"
"Mirror Door"
"Baba O'Riley"
"Eminence Front"
"A Man in a Purple Dress"
"Black Widow's Eyes"
"You Better You Bet"
"My Generation"
"Cry If You Want"
"Won't Get Fooled Again"
"Pinball Wizard"
"Amazing Journey""Sparks"
"See Me, Feel Me"
"Tea & Theatre"
There were some set list substitutions, variations, and order switches during the tour. "Mike Post Theme" was played at the first concert in Reno on 23 February 2007. At the same concert, "The Relay" was substituted for "You Better You Bet", the only occurrence of that on this particular leg of the tour. Also, at three concerts (23, 25 and 26 March), a combination of "The Kids Are Alright" and "Substitute" was performed instead of the mini-opera. Here is a list of the rest of the songs performed on the tour but not on the above list:
"The Relay"
Performed on 23 February.
"Mike Post Theme"
Performed on 23 February.
"Naked Eye"
Performed on 26 (as encore) & 28 (as encore) February; and 5 (as encore), 8 (as encore) & 23 March.
"The Kids Are Alright"
Performed on 23, 25 & 26 March.
"Substitute"
Performed on 23, 25 & 26 March.
"Dirty Water" (Pete Townshend solo song)
Performed (briefly) on 23 March.
"Ring of Fire" (Johnny Cash)
Performed on 23 March.

2007 UK/Europe leg
This particular leg of the tour lasted from 16 May 2007 in Lisbon, Portugal until 9 July 2007 in Helsinki, Finland (with an additional concert on 6 October 2007 in Hanover, Germany for a VW Bus Convention). This particular set is taken from a concert at the Atlántico Pavilion in Lisbon, Portugal on 16 May 2007. All songs written by Pete Townshend except where noted.

"I Can't Explain"
"The Seeker"
"Fragments" (Lawrence Ball and Townshend)
"Who Are You"
"Behind Blue Eyes"
"Real Good Looking Boy" (Townshend, Luigi Creatore, Hugo Peretti and George David Weiss) (Added on 5 June)
"Sound Round"
"Pick Up the Peace"
"Endless Wire"
"We Got a Hit"
"They Made My Dream Come True"
"Mirror Door"
"Baba O'Riley"
"Eminence Front"
"Drowned"
"A Man in a Purple Dress"
"The Real Me" 
"5.15" (Replaced by "You Better You Bet" after 22 May)
"My Generation"
"Cry If You Want" (Dropped after 29 June)
"Won't Get Fooled Again"
"The Kids Are Alright"
"Pinball Wizard"
"Amazing Journey"/"Sparks"
"See Me, Feel Me"
"Tea & Theatre"
There were some set list substitutions, variations, and order switches during the tour. The third song slot alternated between "Substitute", "The Relay" and "Anyway, Anyhow, Anywhere". At certain shows, the mini-opera was dropped as well. Here is a list of the rest of the songs performed on the tour but not on the above list:
"Mike Post Theme"
Performed on 8 February; and 17, 22 & 23 May.
"The Relay"
Performed on 17, 19, 22, 23, 25, 26 & 30 May; and 1, 8, 9, 11, 13, 16, 18, 19, 23, 24 & 29 June; and 4 & 9 July and 6 October.
"I'm One"
Performed on 23 May.
"Anyway, Anyhow, Anywhere" (Roger Daltrey and Townshend)
Performed on 1, 16, 18, 19, 23, 24, 26, 27, 29 & 30 June; and 4, 6 & 7 July; and 6 October.
"Magic Bus"
Performed on 11 June; and 7 July; and 6 October.
"Let's See Action"
Performed on 11 June.
"Old Red Wine"
Performed on 11 June and other dates.

46664 concert set
To celebrate World AIDS Day, The Who made only their second ever appearance in South Africa to again perform at Nelson Mandela's 46664 concerts, this time on 1 December in Johannesburg. All songs written by Pete Townshend.

"Baba O'Riley"
"My Generation"
"Substitute"
"Pinball Wizard"
"Love, Reign o'er Me"
"You Better You Bet"
"Magic Bus"
"Eminence Front"
"Who Are You"
"Won't Get Fooled Again"

Tour dates

See also
List of The Who tours and performances

References

External links
Official tour site
Recorded shows store
The Who Online Concert Guide (2006)
The Who Online Concert Guide (2007)
List of Songs 2006
List of Songs 2007

2006 concert tours
2007 concert tours
The Who concert tours
Concert tours of the United States
Concert tours of Europe
Concert tours of Canada
Concert tours of the United Kingdom